Fredericton-Silverwood was a provincial electoral district for the Legislative Assembly of New Brunswick, Canada.  It was first created using the name Fredericton South in the 1973 redrawing of electoral districts by splitting the two-member district of Fredericton and was first used in the 1974 general election.  Its name was changed to Fredericton-Silverwood in the 2006 redrawing of electoral districts. The riding was split in two along Smythe Street in the 2013 redistribution, with half of the riding going to Fredericton South and half to Fredericton West-Hanwell.

History 

It was created in 1973 as Fredericton South and included those portions of the old multi-member district of Fredericton south of the Saint John River. It lost eastern territory in the 1994 electoral redistribution to the new district of Fredericton-Fort Nashwaak and again lost eastern territory in 2006 this time to the new district of Fredericton-Lincoln. Its name was changed in 2006 to Fredericton-Silverwood to prevent confusion among city residents who would identify with "Fredericton South" as residents of the south side of the Saint John River, many of whom were not in the district.

The district was a bellwether, having been won by the governing party in every general election from its creation through its abolishment.

Members of the Legislative Assembly

Election results

Fredericton-Silverwood

Fredericton South

See also 
 New Brunswick electoral redistribution, 1973
 New Brunswick electoral redistribution, 1994
 New Brunswick electoral redistribution, 2006

References 

 "An Electoral Map for New Brunswick: Final Report of the Electoral Boundaries and Representation Commission"
 Office of the Chief Electoral Officer.  "2006 Provincial Election Results"
 CBC riding profile

External links 
Website of the Legislative Assembly of New Brunswick
Map of Fredericton-Silverwood riding as of 2010, from Elections NB

Former provincial electoral districts of New Brunswick
Politics of Fredericton
Constituencies established in 1973